Romagne is a commune in the Vienne department in the Nouvelle-Aquitaine region in western France.

See also
Communes of the Vienne department
La Vallée des Singes

References

Communes of Vienne